Ram Singh Kaswan (born 10 August 1945) is Indian politician and a leader of Bharatiya Janata Party. He was Member of Parliament from Churu district in Rajasthan, India.

Personal life

He was born on 10 August 1945 at village Kalri in Churu district to mother Kastoori Devi and father Deep Chand Kaswan. His father Deep Chand was also a member of parliament. Their ancestors had migrated to Kalri from Matani village in Bhiwani district of Haryana. He married Kamla Kaswan on 8 May 1965 and has three daughters and one son Rahul Kaswan who succeeded his father as MP for Churu. 

Kaswan was educated at Doonger College, Bikaner and Rajasthan University. His educational qualification is B.A and LL.B. He is a self-proclaimed agriculturist, political and social worker. His favourite pastime is reading. As a politician, he has visited Malaysia and Singapore.

See also 

 Rahul Kaswan, Ram Singh Kaswan's son, political successor and BJP MP
 Leader of the Bharatiya Janata Party in the Parliament of India

References

External links
 Ram Singh Kaswan, Churu
 Lok Sabha member's Home page - Ram Singh Kaswan
 Official Biography of Ram Singh Kaswan
 News Item

1945 births
Bharatiya Janata Party politicians from Rajasthan
Living people
India MPs 2004–2009
University of Rajasthan alumni
India MPs 2009–2014
People from Churu district
India MPs 1991–1996
India MPs 1999–2004
Lok Sabha members from Rajasthan